Capacio is a surname. Notable people with the surname include:

 Ely Capacio (1955–2014), Filipino basketball player, coach, and executive
 Glenn Capacio (born 1964), Filipino basketball player and coach, brother of Ely